The Nigerien Progressive Union (UPN) was a political party in Niger led by Georges Condat.

History
The party was founded on March 15, 1953, as a breakaway from the Union of Nigerien Independents and Sympathisers (UNIS) over the issue of forming a united front with the Nigerien Progressive Party.

A joint list of UPN and the Nigerien Action Bloc (BNA) of Issoufou Saïdou Djermakoye received some 126,000 votes in the January 1956 French parliamentary elections. The list was the most voted-for, finishing in first place in seven provinces, and Condat won one of the two seats in the French National Assembly. The UPN later merged into BNA.

References

Defunct political parties in Niger
Political parties established in 1953
1953 establishments in Niger
Political parties disestablished in 1956
1956 disestablishments in Niger